Adolfo de Barros Leite (born 8 March 1992) is a Portuguese former footballer who played as a goalkeeper.

Club career
Born in Lisbon, Leite spent the vast majority of his ten-year senior career in the lower leagues or amateur football. His professional input consisted of two Segunda Liga matches for C.F. Os Belenenses in the 2010–11 season.

References

External links

1992 births
Living people
Footballers from Lisbon
Portuguese footballers
Association football goalkeepers
Liga Portugal 2 players
Segunda Divisão players
C.F. Os Belenenses players
C.D. Mafra players
G.D. Vitória de Sernache players